Úlfljótsvatn (Úlfljótr's Lake) is a lake in southern Iceland, to the south of lake Þingvallavatn, 74km east of Reykjavík. Úlfljótsvatn is named after Úlfljótr, an important man who was involved in the Alþingi (Icelandic Parliament) in 930.

In the vicinity, the Icelanders have many summer cottages.

Geography
The lake has an area of 3.6 km² and is situated at an altitude of 80 m. At the deepest point, Úlfljótsvatn is about 34.5 meters deep. The lake has a water area of 3.6 km² and is located directly south of the larger lake Þingvallavatn on the Sog river, which continues to Álftavatn.

The lake in the warm season attracts anglers. Trout and lake char can be found in the waters of the lake.

History
Orkuveita Reykjavíkur bought the rights in 1929-1933 to generate electricity in the upper run of the Sog. In 1937, the Ljósafoss  power station was then built, increasing the water level by about 1 metre.

The Icelandic Scout and Guides Association has had its national scout centre by the lake since 1940. It hosted the World Scout Moot there in 2017.

Traffic
To the east of the lake is road no. 36, southwest of road no. 360.

See also
 List of lakes in Iceland

References

External links

Lakes of Iceland
Rift lakes of Iceland